Fox Racing is an American extreme sports (primarily motocross and mountainbiking), protective equipment, and lifestyle-clothing brand founded in 1974. Fox is owned by Vista Outdoor.

History
The early histories of Fox Racing and Fox Racing Shox were intertwined. Fox Racing Shox is a brand of offroad-racing suspension components founded by Geoff Fox's brother, Bob Fox. Fox Racing Shox was originally owned by Moto-X Fox. In 1977 Bob's division split out as a separate company called Fox Factory

In July 2006, Fox Racing decided to change its corporate name to Fox Head.. The move was complete by the fall of that year. Fox decided such a change would help the brand further penetrate sporting venues aside from motocross, such as mountain bike, wake boarding, surfing; as well as expand into other products.

Peter Fox was named CEO in 2008, with Greg Fox remaining on the board of directors. Peter Fox subsequently left the company, but rejoined when Fox Head was acquired by Altamont Capital Partners in 2014, leaving the founder and his son in charge of the company.

In July 2022, it was announced that Fox Racing would be acquired by Vista Outdoor for $540 million. 

Fox Racing entered the shoe business in early 2022 with the introduction of Union shoe line designed for bicyclists.

References

External links

1974 establishments in California
2014 mergers and acquisitions
2022 mergers and acquisitions
American companies established in 1974
Clothing companies established in 1974
Companies based in Irvine, California
Motorcycling retailers
Privately held companies based in California
Retail companies established in 1974
Sportswear brands